Qian Yunlu (born October 1944) is a retired Chinese politician. He served as the Communist Party chief of Heilongjiang province in Northeastern China and Guizhou province in southwest China. He also served as Governor of Guizhou.

Qian Yunlu was born in Hubei province in 1944. He was elected Communist Party chief of Heilongjiang on January 27, 2008.

References

|-

|-

1944 births
Politicians from Xiaogan
CCP committee secretaries of Heilongjiang
Living people
Governors of Guizhou
Chinese Communist Party politicians from Hubei
People's Republic of China politicians from Hubei
Members of the 16th Central Committee of the Chinese Communist Party
Secretary-General of the Chinese People's Political Consultative Conference
Vice Chairpersons of the National Committee of the Chinese People's Political Consultative Conference